Jesus Salud (born 3 May 1963) is a Filipino-born American former professional boxer. Originally from Sinait in the Philippines, he resides in Honolulu, Hawaii. He won the WBA super bantamweight title by disqualification on December 11, 1989, in a bout against Juan Jose Estrada.

In 2002, he lost to then-two division champion Manny Pacquiao in a three-round exhibition.

Exhibition boxing record

References

External links

1963 births
Living people
Super-bantamweight boxers
Filipino male boxers
Boxers from Hawaii
World boxing champions
World Boxing Association champions
American male boxers
Sportspeople from Ilocos Sur
Sportspeople from Honolulu